A kangaroo court is a court that ignores recognized standards of law or justice, carries little or no official standing in the territory within which it resides, and is typically convened ad hoc. A kangaroo court may ignore due process and come to a predetermined conclusion.  The term may also apply to a court held by a legitimate judicial authority which intentionally disregards the court's legal or ethical obligations (compare show trial).

A kangaroo court could also develop when the structure and operation of the forum result in an inferior brand of adjudication. A common example of this is when institutional disputants ("repeat players") have excessive and unfair structural advantages over individual disputants ("one-shot players").

Etymology
The term kangaroo court is often erroneously believed to have its origin from the courts of Australia's penal colonies. The Oxford English Dictionary cites the first published instance of the term as from an American source, A Stray Yankee in Texas by Philip Paxton, published in 1853. There are, however, earlier instances of the term, including an 1841 article in The Daily Picayune, New Orleans, that quotes another publication, the Concordia Intelligencer, reporting several lynchings instituted "on charges of the Kangaroo court". The Picayune article also asks "What is a kangaroo court?"

Some sources suggest that it may have been popularized during the California Gold Rush of 1849 to which many thousands of Australians flocked. In consequence of the Australian miners' presence, it may have come about as a description of the hastily carried-out proceedings used to deal with the issue of claim-jumping miners.

Ostensibly, the term comes from the notion of justice proceeding "by leaps", like a kangaroo – in other words, "jumping over" (intentionally ignoring) evidence that would be in favour of the defendant. An alternative theory is that as these courts are often convened quickly to deal with an immediate issue, they are called kangaroo courts since they have "jumped up" out of nowhere, like a kangaroo. Another possibility is that the phrase could refer to the pouch of a kangaroo, meaning the court is in someone's pocket.

Etymologist Philologos argues that the term arose "because a place named Kangaroo sounded comical to its hearers, just as place names like Kalamazoo, and Booger Hole, and Okefenokee Swamp, strike us as comical."

The phrase is popular in the Anglosphere and is still in common use.

As informal proceedings in sport
The term is sometimes used without any negative connotation. For example, many Major League Baseball and Minor League Baseball teams have a kangaroo court to punish players for errors and other mistakes on the field, as well as for being late for a game or practice, not wearing proper attire to road games, or having a messy locker in the clubhouse. Fines are allotted, and at the end of the year, the money collected is given to charity. The organization may also use the money for a team party at the end of the season.

Historical examples
Some examples of adjudication venues described as kangaroo courts are:

 Moscow trials, a series of show trials held by the Soviet Union in 1936–1938 against prominent long-time leaders of Soviet Bolsheviks such as Grigory Zinoviev, Lev Kamenev, Nikolai Bukharin, Alexei Rykov, Karl Radek, Georgy Pyatakov, etc. Verdicts of Moscow trials were pre-defined by Joseph Stalin and specified by decrees of Politburo CPSU.
 The Volksgerichtshof (People's Court) of Nazi Germany that convicted people who were suspected of being involved with the failed plot to assassinate Hitler on July 20, 1944.
 In 1835, a so-called "vigilance committee" in Nashville, Tennessee, United States, ran a show but legally meaningless trial, by which they convicted abolitionist minister Amos Dresser of distribution of abolitionist publications; he repeatedly claimed innocence. He was publicly whipped 20 lashes, after which he left Tennessee as soon as he could do so safely.

 In August 1979, the People's Revolutionary Tribunal, in Cambodia, tried Pol Pot and his brother Ieng San. After a lengthy trial with a duration of five days, both were sentenced to death in absentia on 19 August 1979. Conclusive evidence showed that the verdicts and the sentencing papers had been prepared in advance of the trial. Relying on this evidence, the United Nations proceeded to de-legitimize the tribunal, stating that it did not comply with standards of international law.
 During the Romanian Revolution in 1989, President and Communist Party General Secretary Nicolae Ceaușescu and his wife Elena Ceausescu were sentenced to death by a kangaroo court consisting of members of the military: Two military judges, two colonels, and three other officers of lesser ranks. The prosecutor was Dan Voinea; two lawyers represented the defendant. All the members of the court were part of the Romanian People's Army, which had recently switched to the side of the revolutionaries.
 In July 1987, five individuals (most prominently Anatoly Dyatlov, Viktor Bryukhanov, and Nikolai Fomin) implicated in the 1986 Chernobyl disaster were put on trial in what was widely recognized as a show trial with pre-determined verdicts. Despite strong evidence that serious design flaws in the Soviet RBMK nuclear reactor were largely to blame for the accident, all defendants were sentenced to hard labor in Soviet labor camps.

See also

References

Further reading
  288 pages.

External links

 The Straight Dope: What's the origin of "kangaroo court"?

Abuse of the legal system
Courts by type
Metaphors referring to animals
Pejorative terms
Informal legal terminology
Types of trials
Vigilantism